NGC 6101 (also known as Caldwell 107) is a globular cluster in the constellation Apus, which was discovered by James Dunlop and catalogued by him as Δ68. It is located at a distance of about 47,600 light-years from the Sun and about 36,500 light-years from the galactic center of the Milky Way. It requires a telescope of at least  aperture to resolve individual stars. Research revealed this cluster to  contain an unexpected large number of black holes.

References

External links
 

6101
Apus (constellation)
Globular clusters
107
Discoveries by James Dunlop